Valle Canal Novo is a nature reserve near Marano, a small town in the north east of Italy. Consisting primarily of a lagoon (or valle), which was historically used for fishing, it is 121 hectares in size and in the same protected area as the Foci dello Stella.

References 

Nature reserves in Italy